Zbýšov is a municipality and village in Kutná Hora District in the Central Bohemian Region of the Czech Republic. It has about 600 inhabitants.

Administrative parts

Villages of Březí, Chlum, Damírov, Klucké Chvalovice, Krchlebská Lhota, Opatovice and Zbudovice are administrative parts of Zbýšov.

History
The first written mention of Zbýšov is from 1257.

Sights
Zbýšov is known for Zbýšovský Pond, used for swimming and fishing.

References

External links

Villages in Kutná Hora District